Tim Jenniskens (born 23 September 1986 in Tilburg) is a Dutch field hockey player. At the 2012 Summer Olympics he competed with the Netherlands national field hockey team in the men's tournament, winning a silver medal.

References

External links
 

1986 births
Living people
Field hockey players at the 2012 Summer Olympics
Olympic field hockey players of the Netherlands
Dutch male field hockey players
Olympic silver medalists for the Netherlands
Olympic medalists in field hockey
Sportspeople from Tilburg
Medalists at the 2012 Summer Olympics
Hockey India League players
Delhi Waveriders players
20th-century Dutch people
21st-century Dutch people